Margaret Hewitt (1800s–1900s) was a British suffragette employed by the Women's Social and Political Union. She was involved in protests in 1909 and arrested. She was chosen to visit the Eagle House aka "Suffragette's Rest" where a plaque commemorated her planting holly bush in the arboretum for leading suffragettes.

Life 
Hewitt's early life is unknown. In 1908 she came to notice when she interrupted Lord Carrington as he arrived in Manchester to give him a copy of the newspaper Votes for Women. Carrington told her to send it to him by post. She was also campaigning that month in Greater Manchester at Altringham and organising the collecting stewards for a suffragist meeting in Heaton Park.

In 1909 suffragettes were arrested for obstruction during a visit by Winston Churchill because they refused to leave the meeting place. Those taken to court were Edith Rigby, Grace Alderman, Catherine Worthington and Beth Hesmondhalgh. They all chose prison for seven days, in preference to a fine, except for Edith Rigby. Her father, annoyingly, paid the fine claiming that his daughter (a later proven arsonist) was just in the bad company of "hired women". Edith's brother, Arthur, was reported to have pointed at Hewitt, saying that it was all due to "that painted jezebel". Hewitt was wearing a hat at a jaunty angle and lipstick.

In 1909, Hewitt was arrested in Preston and she was invited to Eagle House aka "Suffragette's Rest" near Bath. Key activists from the suffragette movement were invited to stay at the Blathwayt's house and to plant a tree to celebrate their work, a prison sentence or to mark having been on hunger strike. The trees were known as "Annie's Arboretum" after Annie Kenney. Hewitt planted an Ilex aquifolium albo marginata Holly on 3 October 1909 in Annie's Arboretum. She had her photo taken by Linley Blathwayt, a lead plaque was mounted and she was photographed with Annie, Mary Blathwayt and Bodo (Linley Blathwayt's Oldsmobile car).

In 1909, she was the WSPU's lead on Dorset in Weymouth. She is also mentioned in an unclaimed diarist's belongings which includes a letter addressed to her. The diarists profile is like Mary Blathwayt of Batheaston who had a younger brother named William who worked in Germany.

References 

1800s births
1900s deaths
Suffragettes